The Lantz Farm and Nature Preserve Wildlife Management Area is located on  in Jacksonburg, east of Blacksville in Wetzel County, West Virginia. Part of the site is operated as a retreat for the farm's owner, Wheeling University.

References

External links
West Virginia DNR District 1 Wildlife Management Areas

Wildlife management areas of West Virginia
Protected areas of Wetzel County, West Virginia
Farms in West Virginia
Wheeling University
IUCN Category V